This is a list of notable footballers who have played for Iraklis. Generally, this means players that have played 100 or more first-class matches for the club. A number of other players who have played an important role in a title win can also be included for their contribution. Club captains and seasonal top goalscorers are included.
Players in Iraklis' early history are also included despite not necessarily playing 100 matches.

For a list of all Iraklis players, major or minor, with a Wikipedia article, see Category:Iraklis Thessaloniki F.C. players, and for the current squad see the main Iraklis Thessaloniki F.C. article.

Players are listed according to the date of their first team debut. Appearances and goals are for first-team competitive matches only. Substitute appearances included.

Appearance figures as of 8 February 2020

References
RSSSF

Players